The Lost Boy is the fifth serial of the first series of the British science fiction television series The Sarah Jane Adventures. It first aired on the CBBC channel in two weekly parts on 12 and 19 November 2007. This episode was intentionally named after Dave Pelzer's The Lost Boy.

In the story, Luke Smith, Sarah Jane Smith's adopted son, is allegedly reunited with his biological human parents, despite prior assumptions that he had been created by the Bane. However, the family is actually a disguised alien family of criminals called the Slitheen, who are attempting to get revenge on Luke for past encounters.

Plot
Alan agrees with his daughter Maria that they will not move away from Sarah Jane's neighbourhood on the condition that Alan is kept up to date with Maria's battles against aliens.

Mr Smith, an alien supercomputer called a Xylok that was freed from under the Earth's surface, concocts a story where Luke is the son of two humans, Jay and Heidi (who are actually Slitheen in disguise), and not created by the Bane. He also fakes a DNA match between the profiles of Luke and the fictional son, Ashley Stafford, as well as a photograph of Luke with Jay and Heidi. Luke is put in the Slitheen's custody. Mr Smith suggests that Sarah Jane visits the Pharos Institute, a research centre where alien technology, whose plans were scavenged by the Slitheen, is being used to harness telekinetic energy. He later asks Sarah Jane to steal one of the telekinetic energiser headsets there, supposedly for analysis.

The Slitheen intend to "bottle" the energy and sell it off, which would kill Luke, whom they blame for killing Slitheen members at his school. The Slitheen test Luke's abilities with another of the institute's headsets, before he escapes. Alan adapts a computer virus that could destroy Mr Smith. Predicting Luke would return to the attic, while double-crossing the Slitheen, Mr Smith holds Clyde hostage, forcing Luke to use his mind and the headset to pull the Moon towards the Earth, to serve Mr Smith's purpose of releasing other Xylok from within the Earth at the cost of the planet. With Mr Smith momentarily distracted by K9, Sarah Jane inserts the virus, which makes Mr Smith forget his purpose. As the Moon gets closer to the Earth, Sarah Jane tells Mr Smith he has a new purpose: to safeguard planet Earth. The Moon returns to its original position, K9 goes back to guarding the black hole, and the Slitheen leave Earth.

Continuity
 The Slitheen reappear in these episodes, this time wearing new slimline skin-suits.
 The Blathereen, cousins and rivals of the Slitheen, wore slimline skin-suits in The Monsters Inside.
 Clips from "Invasion of the Bane", Revenge of the Slitheen and Eye of the Gorgon were shown in these episodes. At the beginning of the first episode, Maria discusses the previous adventures she has had with Sarah Jane in order to bring her father up to speed.
 K9 returns briefly in Part Two to distract and battle Mr. Smith. This episode marks his first appearance since "Invasion of the Bane".
 Sarah Jane's membership in UNIT during her original run as a companion of the Third and Fourth Doctors is stated in the report the Chief Inspector reads. Attached to it is a photograph of Sarah Jane from the classic era.
 The UNIT dating controversy is addressed on the report about UNIT that the Chief Inspector reads, and to which Sarah Jane's photograph is attached. The report's second paragraph refers UNIT's "golden period that spanned the sixties, the seventies, and some would say, the eighties."
 When asked by Alan if the Slitheen would ever return to Earth from Raxicoricofallapatorius, Sarah Jane says she imagines so.
 Mr Smith's crystalline self was discovered by geologists at the site of Krakatoa which Sarah Jane describes as "the biggest volcanic eruption civilisation has ever seen." Either the First or Second Doctor was present at the eruption, as was the Ninth Doctor.
 Sarah Jane's monologue in the final scene, "I've seen amazing things out there in space, but strange things can happen wherever you are," reprises her voiceover from the start of the pilot episode, "Invasion of the Bane".

Outside references
BBC News 24 is once again shown to broadcast 'Breaking News' during the serial, although again without the BBC logo present.
Alan likens Luke's creation by the Bane to the creation of Frankenstein's Monster.
Alan compares his discovery regarding the existence of aliens to The X-Files.
Mr Smith refers to the MITRE project as a "destroyer of worlds", the English translation of what Vishnu proclaims himself upon taking on his multi-armed form in the Bhagavad Gita: "kālo'smi lokakṣayakṛtpravṛddho lokānsamāhartumiha pravṛttaḥ" (Now I am become death, the destroyer of worlds). The passage was made famous in Western culture in 1965 by Dr. J. Robert Oppenheimer when interviewed for NBC's documentary, The Decision to Drop the Bomb, and asked the thoughts he had at the first man-made nuclear detonation on 16 July 1945.

Reception

Firefox News commented upon the episode positively, particularly in comparison with Torchwood'''s first finale episode, "End of Days". Digital Spy commented that the tone of the episode was strangely dark, having expected more jovial adventures following the Slitheen adventure which kick-started the series, commenting "dark emotions have been regularly encountered, often to do with human loss, and a fascinating morbid tone has descended". The Cult Editor for the website, Ben Rawson-Jones, noted a similarity with some Doctor Who'' stories wherein "the formula of an old enemy from earlier in the series returning has been closely adhered to. Such a shame it had to be the Slitheen then, rather than any evil nuns or General Kudlak's brethren".

Novelisation

This was the sixth of eleven Sarah Jane Adventures serials to be adapted as a novel. Written by Phil Ford, the book was first published in Paperback on 6 November 2008.

Notes

References

External links

Sarah Jane Adventures homepage

Novelisation

The Sarah Jane Adventures episodes
Slitheen television stories
2007 British television episodes
Television episodes about telekinesis
Television episodes about child abduction